Geoyeo-dong is a neighbourhood, dong of Songpa-gu, Seoul, South Korea.

Education
Schools located in Geoyeo-dong:
 Seoul Geowon Elementary School
 Seoul Youngpung Elementary School
 Geowon Middle School
 Songpa Technical High School

Transportation 
 Geoyeo Station of

See also
Administrative divisions of South Korea
This district of Seoul is well known for its fishing hot spots.

References

External links
 Geoyeo 1-dong resident center website
 Songpa-gu map

Neighbourhoods of Songpa District